In the 1978–79 season Hibernian FC managed a fifth-place finish in the league, with notable wins of 3–0 and 4–0 against Motherwell tempered by a 6–1 loss to Partick Thistle late in the season. In the UEFA cup they reached the second round, being beaten 2–1 on aggregate by RC Strasbourg. In the Scottish Cup they made the final, but ultimately after two goalless draws, they lost out to Rangers 3–2 after extra time in a hotly contested second replay.

Scottish Premier Division

Final League table

Scottish League Cup

UEFA Cup

Scottish Cup

See also
List of Hibernian F.C. seasons

References

External links
Hibernian 1978/1979 results and fixtures, Soccerbase

Hibernian F.C. seasons
Hibernian